Betaal, Betāl or Betāla is an Indian zombie horror streaming television series based in a remote village that serves as the battleground between East India Company Army officer Lt. Col John Lynedoch, his battalion of zombie redcoats from the Indian Rebellion of 1857, and the fictional CIPD force. The series is written and directed by Patrick Graham and co-directed by Nikhil Mahajan. Produced by Blumhouse Productions and Red Chillies Entertainment, the web series stars Vineet Kumar Singh and Aahana Kumra in significant roles.  The series received generally negative reviews, with praise for its performances and the use of mythology and zombie, but criticism for its lack of thrill and editing.

Synopsis 

This miniseries generally focuses on Commandant Vikram Sirohi (Vineet Kumar Singh) and his teammates: Ahluwalia, Akbar, and Haq (Akbar's cousin, a new recruit), from the "Baaz Squad", an elite unit of the fictional Counter Insurgency Police Department (CIPD). Commandant Tyagi (Suchitra Pillai), who is in-charge of "Baaz Squad", privately colludes with the owner of Surya Construction Company, Ajay Mudhalvan (Jitendra Joshi) to relocate or murder Naxalite rebels and Adivasi people from their lands so they can be used for various construction projects overseen by Surya Corp. She keeps the true motivations of these operations from her squad's knowledge and vehemently denounces media and public figures who attempt to communicate the truth to the public.  Vikram follows her blindly to avoid the shame and guilt he feels for his actions. He is particularly haunted by a memory concerning a young girl in the tribal regions of India.

The film begins with a large group of Adivasi people conducting a ritual at a shrine to a spirit they call the "Betaal". An elderly woman who can commune with the spirit touches the statue of the "Betaal" within their worship hall. It gives her visions, revealing what might happen if the "Betaal" is allowed to leave the tunnel it has been trapped in since the days of the British East India Company. She warns the community not to allow the tunnel to be opened.

Outside of the village, Mudhalvan, his wife, Shakuntala, and his young daughter, Saanvi, are preparing to turn the community and the surrounding area into a construction site. They are rushing to meet deadlines before the CM arrives to inaugurate the project. Mudhalvan has ordered Commandant Tyagi and Baaz Squad to have the area cleared for a highway-building project in a remote village near the Betaal Mountain. When the squad arrives there, the Adivasi villagers are refusing to leave their homes and the area. Baaz Squad forcibly removes the villagers and burns the homes in preparation for the entire community to be razed. The villagers retreat to the entrance of a tunnel, defending it with antique weapons and farm tools. Vikram demands they leave the tunnel entrance so it can be cleared for the development project. When they refuse, Vikram and Baaz Squad hesitate to open fire on the villagers without being fired upon. Mudhalvan's subordinate, Bhunnu, secretly activates a bomb planted near the tunnel entrance, tricking Tyagi and Vikram into believing it is an attack by the villagers. The Baaz Squad kills all but two of the villagers: a woman named Puniya and her husband, Sarpanch.

After the tunnel is cleared, some construction workers go inside to begin work when screams start coming from the tunnel and a single disemboweled worker manages to stumble out of the tunnel before dying. Baaz Squad, believing Naxalites are inside, attempt to secure the tunnel but suffer heavy losses and injuries. Tyagi and Haq are among the wounded and must be carried out. A horde of undead British soldiers swarm from the cave, forcing Baaz Squad, Mudhavalan and his family, and the villagers to flee. Puniya and Sarpanch find an old British barracks and lock themselves in. While Baaz Squad and Mudhalvan are forcing their way in, Mudhalvan's wife is killed. Tyagi, whose hair has turned white, begins acting strangely while Haq begins to succumb to his wounds. The team realizes their comms and electronic equipment is malfunctioning, cutting them off from the outside world.

As his deceased teammates reanimate, Vikram and the survivors learns from Puniya and records in the old barracks quarters that the undead outside are actually the former 90th Taunton Volunteers regiment under the command of British East India Company Lieutenant Colonel John Lynedoch, who was a respected veteran soldier as well as a noted practitioner of black magic. A bloodthirsty, feared regiment, they followed Lynedoch into the tunnel as he pursued his tyrannical ambition of becoming an emperor of British India. He hoped to find the shrine within and take the powers of the "Betaal", sealed in the roots of the mountain. However, Indian resistance fighters sealed the entire regiment (and Lynedoch himself) into the tunnel. Lynedoch chose to sacrifice his son, who was a soldier in the very same regiment, to become the "Betaal". Shortly after, the Colonel devoured his regiment and waited for hundreds of years until he could be released and use his undead army to cover India under his dark banner. The Colonel desires Saanvi as a pure sacrifice to augment his powers and satisfy his hunger. Puniya has used a magic circle of ashes, turmeric, and salt, and a ritual fire to magically defend the barracks from the zombies. However, as the monsoon rains set in, the magical defenses fall before the Colonel and his regiment advances, killing Sarpanch before the survivors can seal the doors of the building.

As the group struggles over what to do, Tyagi is revealed to be under the Colonel's possession and Haq becomes a living zombie. The dead soldiers and Shakuntala also come under the Colonel's control. The zombies of the Colonel use their hive mind to assault the barracks. Though Baaz Squad decides to protect Saanvi, Mudhalvan decides to sell her out to the Colonel when Saanvi reveals she knew that the tunnel explosion was a false attack to ensure the project's construction. He allows the zombie army into the barracks, killing Ahluwalia in the process. Vikram is tempted by the Colonel to turn over Saanvi, but manages to lead the survivors out of the fort, destroying many zombies while doing so. They head to the villagers' worship hall to retrieve hidden explosives and destroy the shrine. The Colonel tracks the survivors to the worship hall through Ahluwalia's body before Vikram kills her. Meanwhile, Puniya and Akbar are separated from the group as they try to make contact with an arriving security team from the CM's staff. The arrivals are killed but the two survivors manage to take the CM's vehicle. The Colonel uses Tyagi's body to try to abduct Saanvi but Vikram is able to stop her. However, the Colonel manages to kill Bhunnu and possess Vikram, using his body to drag Saanvi to the sacrificial altar in the mountain tunnel.

Mudhalvan is revealed to be caged by the altar in punishment for his failed promise to acquire Saanvi for the Colonel. As Vikram resists the Colonel's mental possession, Lynedoch appears in person and forces Vikram to recount the story of the young girl from his memories. On Tyagi's orders, he shot the girl after massacring her community so she would not be a witness to the unit's crimes. Vikram's desire to atone for this horrible act allows him to briefly escape the Colonel's power and free Saanvi. As the Colonel and the zombies begin to devour Vikram, Saanvi runs and manages to detonate the explosives, destroying the shrine. She escapes through the tunnel, where Puniya and Akbar have killed the zombies guarding the tunnel entrance and rescue her.

As they drive to safety, they begin to hear widespread reports of attacks from unknown hostiles. Saanvi reads from the book that even if the shrine should be sealed, it should not be destroyed at any cost, as it also acts as a container for the "Betaal"'s power. If the shrine is broken, the "Betaal"'s undead curse can spread uncontrollably, with devastating consequences. Akbar turns on a news channel, which shows that Mumbai is under attack from multiple hostiles. The camera focuses on a fleet of 18th-century wooden warships emerging from the fog over the water. They are all revealed to be flying the  British flag before the screen cuts to black.

Cast 
 Vineet Kumar Singh as Vikram Sirohi 
 Aahana Kumra as DC 'Ahlu' Ahluwalia
 Suchitra Pillai as Commandant Tyagi
 Jatin Goswami as Assad Akbar
 Jitendra Joshi as Ajay Mudhalvan
 Siddharth Menon as Nadir Haq
 Manjiri Pupala as Puniya
 Swapnil Kotriwar as Kanji
 Meenal Kapoor as Shakuntala Mudhalvan
 Yashwant Wasnik as Sarpanch
 Savita Bajaj as Mausi
 Ankur Vikal as Bhunnu
 Pankaj Upadhyay as Inspector Khurrana
Richard Dillane as Colonel Lynedoch
 Krishna Singh Bisht as Kaushal
 Pawan Singh as Yadav
 Akhilesh Unnithan as Chandran 
 Ratan Nag as Tripathi
 Shrishti Fadtare as Leila
 Tanmay Khemani as Drummer Boy
 Syna Anand as Saanvi Mudhalvan * Harshvardhan Singh as pretas

Episodes

Production
On 15 June 2019, it was announced that Netflix had given the production a series order. The series is written and directed by Patrick Graham, co-written by Suhani Kanwar and co-directed by Nikhil Mahajan and Casting by Paragg Mehta. The show was produced by Red Chillies Entertainment. The shooting was wrapped up in August 2019. It was released on Netflix, making it the second collaboration between the production house and Netflix.

Promotion and release

The trailer was released by Netflix India on 8 May 2020. The series started streaming on Netflix from 24 May 2020.

Critical reception
Rahul Desai from Film Companion said that, "Betaal, for much of its four episodes, is a brilliant homegrown spoof on the zombie-folk horror genre. The zombies are utterly useless, spending their time knocking on closed doors and being butter-fingered flesh eaters." Poulomi Das on Silver Screen India provide another scathingly negative review for the show's opening season saying, "...the zombie thriller – another Netflix misfire in a series of misfires – somehow manages to be too long, repetitive and needlessly convoluted, stretching its one-line plot, glaringly under-written, way too thin." In contrast to these negative reviews, postcolonial scholar Johan Höglund's academic study of the series notes its political content and argues that the "zombie pandemic that erupts in Betaal is an attempt to render the apocalyptic violence and death that unregulated capitalism performs on ecology and precarious communities"

References

External links
 

2020 Indian television series debuts
Indian television series distributed by Netflix
Indian horror fiction television series
Red Chillies Entertainment
Works about the Indian Rebellion of 1857
Zombies in television
British India in fiction
Indian action television series
Ghosts in television
Vampires in television